Cry Vengeance! is a 1961 American TV movie directed by Franklin Schaffner.

Plot
Davidde is the head of a gang of bandits in Sicily who regards himself as a modern-day Robin Hood. He is betrayed by gang member Andrea.

Cast
Ben Gazzara as Davidde
Peter Falk as a priest
Sal Mineo as Andrea

Production
The show was a one-hour drama by Robert Crean produced by Robert Alan Aurthur. The show was meant to air in February 1961 but was postponed until April 18, 1961.

Sal Mineo said is part was "a role an actor can really get into. Good dramatic impact, good writing, good character development."

Reception
The New York Times said there were "flashes of meaningful dialogue" but that the show was "disjointed and obscure, handicapped by acting that was too intense and production that was artificial and cumbersome."

References

External links
Cry Vengeance at BFI
Cry Vengeance at IMDb

1960s gang films
1961 television films
1961 films
American black-and-white films
American gang films
American drama television films
Films directed by Franklin J. Schaffner
Films set in Sicily
1960s English-language films
1960s American films